Josephat may refer to:

Josephat Ababu (born 1980), Kenyan cricketer
Josephat T. Benoit (1900–1976), American politician
Josephat Karanja (1931–1994), Kenyan politician
Josephat Kiprono (born 1973), Kenyan distance and marathon runner
Josephat Kuntsevich (1580–1623), monk and archbishop of the Ukrainian Greek Catholic Church
Josephat Machuka (born 1973), Kenyan runner
Josephat Kiprono Menjo (born 1979), Kenyan long-distance runner
Josephat Koli Nanok, Kenyan politician
Josephat Ndambiri (born 1985), Kenyan long-distance runner
Josephat Torner, Tanzanian albino activist

See also
Josaphat (disambiguation)
Josepha, a surname
Jehoshaphat (9th century BC), king of the Kingdom of Judah